Lee Sung-min (born October 15, 1968) is a South Korean actor. He is best known for his supporting roles on television and film, notably his much-praised performances in Golden Time (2012), Broken (2014), and Misaeng: Incomplete Life (2014). Lee has also received critical acclaim for his role in the 2018 espionage film The Spy Gone North.

Filmography

Film

Television series

Web series

Theater

Awards and nominations

Listicles

State honors

Notes

References

External links
 
 
 

1968 births
People from North Gyeongsang Province
South Korean male stage actors
South Korean male television actors
South Korean male film actors
Living people
21st-century South Korean male actors